Patrick Queen (born August 13, 1999) is an American football inside linebacker for the Baltimore Ravens of the National Football League (NFL). He played college football at LSU and was drafted 28th overall by the Ravens in the 2020 NFL Draft.

Early life and high school career
Born to Dwayne and Mary Sue Queen, Queen grew up in Ventress, Louisiana as the youngest (and only boy) of four children. 
He played football in middle school at False River Academy before moving on to high school. He later attended Livonia High School, where he played on the football team as both a linebacker and running back. Queen was a member of Livonia High School's 2014 state championship football team.  As a senior in 2016, he rushed for 1,487 yards and 19 touchdowns on offense and had 66 tackles, seven tackles for losses, and six passes broken up on defense. Queen participated in the 2014 National Combine, and received first team honors as a cornerback.

Recruiting 
Despite his four-star prospect rating, Queen had relatively few offers from Power Five conference schools, particularly the Southeastern Conference, where he had long been interested in playing. Queen's early offers came from smaller schools Tulane, Louisiana, Louisiana–Monroe, Colorado State, McNeese State, Louisiana Tech, and South Florida before receiving offers from Nebraska, Indiana, and his preferred destination of LSU, where he committed without any additional school visits on February 28, 2016. Queen became the first player from Livonia to receive a scholarship from LSU. Queen's recruiting profile was complex, as each major sports recruiting website listed him at a different position. 247Sports, which listed him as a versatile athlete, ranked him as the 17th best ATH in the country, and the 12th best player from Louisiana. Rivals, which listed him as an outside linebacker, ranked him as the 13th best OLB in his class and 8th best recruit from Louisiana. ESPN.com, which listed him as a running back, ranked him the 30th best RB in the country and the 14th best recruit from Louisiana.

College career

Queen made six tackles in 12 games played as a true freshman. He finished his sophomore season with 40 tackles, 5.0 tackles for loss and a sack. Queen entered his junior year on the watchlist for the Butkus Award. Queen finished the regular season with 69 tackles (eight for a loss), 2.5 sacks, three pass deflections, two breakups, an interception and a fumble recovery. Queen was named the Defensive MVP of the 2020 National Championship Game after making eight tackles with 2.5 for a loss and a combined sack against Clemson. Following the end of the season Queen announced that he would forgo his senior season to enter the 2020 NFL Draft.

Professional career

Baltimore Ravens

Queen was selected by the Baltimore Ravens with the 28th pick in the first round of the 2020 NFL Draft. He is the first LSU player the Ravens have ever drafted. Queen made his professional debut in a 38–6 win against the Cleveland Browns recording a team high eight tackles, a sack and a forced fumble.

In Week 5 against the Cincinnati Bengals, Queen led the team with nine tackles, recorded a strip sack on former LSU teammate Joe Burrow that he also recovered, and recovered a fumble lost by Mike Thomas which he returned for a 53-yard touchdown during the 27–3 win.  On October 14, 2020, Queen was named the AFC Defensive Player of the Week for his performance in Week 5. He was placed on the reserve/COVID-19 list by the team on November 3, 2020, and activated four days later.

In Week 13 against the Dallas Cowboys, Queen recorded his first career interception off a pass thrown by Andy Dalton during the 34–17 win.

In 2021, Queen changed his jersey number from #48 to #6 following the relaxation of the NFL's jersey number rules.

NFL career statistics

Notes

References

External links

Baltimore Ravens bio
LSU Tigers bio

1999 births
Living people
People from Pointe Coupee Parish, Louisiana
Players of American football from Louisiana
African-American players of American football
American football linebackers
LSU Tigers football players
Baltimore Ravens players
21st-century African-American sportspeople